Mike Gilbert is a retired sports agent for athletes including former NFL players Marcus Allen and O. J. Simpson.

Following Simpson's trial and acquittal for the murders of his ex-wife Nicole Brown Simpson and Ron Goldman, Gilbert wrote How I Helped O. J. Get Away with Murder: The Shocking Inside Story of Violence, Loyalty, Regret and Remorse. The book was published by Regnery Publishing in May, 2008, and discusses Gilbert's 18-year-long relationship with Simpson, including the influence of their personal and professional relationship in the lead up to, during, and following the trial. Gilbert revealed that the gloves did not fit because, on his advice, Simpson stopped taking his arthritis medicine, which made his hands swell. Gilbert's book also details Simpson confessing to the killings. Gilbert describes how Simpson, having smoked marijuana, taken a sleeping pill, and while drinking beer, confided to him at his Brentwood home weeks after his trial what happened the night of the murders. Simpson said, "If she hadn't opened that door with a knife in her hand... she'd still be alive." This, Gilbert said, confirmed his belief that Simpson had confessed.

Mike Gilbert was also alleged to be the source of some of the memorabilia items that Simpson tried to recover from two memorabilia dealers at the Palace Station Hotel Casino in Las Vegas, Nevada. O. J. Simpson was later convicted of all charges and sentenced to serve 9 to 33 years in a Nevada State prison.

Gilbert was featured in Ezra Edelman's 2016 documentary, O.J.: Made in America, in which he expresses his friendship and working relationship with Simpson, and the role he played in the murder trial. Gilbert expresses his disgust at Simpson's behavior in Miami, as well as his remorse in helping Simpson get away with the murders, of which Gilbert claims he now believes Simpson was guilty and does not regret at all.

References

Year of birth missing (living people)
Living people
American sports agents
O. J. Simpson murder case